The rune  is called Thurs (Old Norse Þurs, a type of entity, from a reconstructed Common Germanic ) in the Icelandic and Norwegian rune poems. In the Anglo-Saxon rune poem it is called thorn, whence the name of the letter þ derived. 
It is transliterated as þ, and has the sound value of a voiceless dental fricative  (the English sound of th as in thing).

The rune is absent from the earliest Vimose inscriptions, but it is found in the Thorsberg chape inscription, dated to ca. AD 200.

Name
In Anglo-Saxon England, the same rune was called Thorn or "Þorn" and it survives as the Icelandic letter Þ (þ).  An attempt has been made to account for the substitution of names by taking "thorn" to be a kenning (metaphor) for "giant".

It is disputed as to whether a distinct system of Gothic runes ever existed, but it is clear that most of the names (but not most of the shapes) of the letters of the Gothic alphabet correspond to those of the Elder Futhark.  The name of 𐌸, the Gothic letter corresponding to Þ is an exception; it is recorded as þiuþ "(the) good" in the Codex Vindobonensis 795, and as such unrelated to either þurs or þorn.
The lack of agreement between the various glyphs and their names in Gothic, Anglo-Saxon, and Old Norse makes it difficult to reconstruct the Elder Futhark rune's Proto-Germanic name.

Assuming that the Scandinavian name þurs is the most plausible reflex of the Elder Futhark name, a Common Germanic form  can be  reconstructed (cf. Old English þyrs "giant, ogre" and  Old High German duris-es "(of the) giant").

Rune poems

The Germanic rune ᚦ is mentioned in three rune poems:

References

See also 

 Rune poem
 Old English rune poem

Thurs